The Flemington Racecourse railway line is a commuter rail passenger train service in Melbourne, Australia. The full service operates between Flemington Racecourse in the inner suburb of Flemington and Flinders Street in the central business district. The service is part of the Public Transport Victoria metropolitan rail network.

Flemington Racecourse line services only operate during selected special events at Flemington Racecourse or Melbourne Showgrounds (or both), serving only their respective stations. Services usually do not serve Newmarket nor Kensington, and services for smaller events terminate and originate from Southern Cross instead of Flinders Street.

Transport  
Yarra Trams operates one route that interchanges with the Flemington line at Showgrounds station:
57: West Maribyrnong - Flinders Street

Description 

The Flemington Racecourse line is a short branch off the Craigieburn line that serves the Melbourne Showgrounds and Flemington Racecourse.  The line is fairly level and has only minor earthworks.  It has one level crossing and one rail-over-road bridge.

The line has no regular services, as it only opens for special events: racedays at the racecourse such as the Melbourne Cup or Oaks Day, and large events at the Showgrounds such as the Royal Melbourne Show itself in September, or the Big Day Out in January.  It is otherwise used to store trains between peak hours.

At times, services are quite intense, with trains running as frequently as every four minutes.  Services are usually operated to either the Showgrounds or the Racecourse, though both stations are served on the rare occasion that there are major events at both places. Trains generally run express through Kensington and Newmarket stations.

History
The Flemington Racecourse branch from Newmarket was opened by the Melbourne and Essendon Railway Company in February 1861, but closed three years later, in July 1864.  The line was taken over by the Victorian Railways and reopened in November 1867.

The line was electrified in 1918 for testing of electric trains, and therefore became the first electrified line in Melbourne.  The first electric train ran a test trip from Newmarket to Flemington Racecourse station in October 1918.

Automatic signalling, using two-position signals, was provided in September 1919.  The line also had sidings serving the Newmarket sale yards and other industries, and the line was operated as a siding most of the time, the points being connected to adjacent point levers and the signals being put out of use.  When passenger services were operated on the line, the points were connected to the signal boxes and the signals were brought into use.  This arrangement finished in the 1980s or 1990s when the sidings were closed.

Infrastructure 
The line is double-tracked throughout. A third track used to be available for down trains from the Showgrounds platform to the Racecourse, but it is now blocked at the Showgrounds end and used as a siding.

The Flemington Racecourse line had Melbourne's last remaining example of two-position automatic signalling, apart from the Hurstbridge line between Greensborough and Hurstbridge. The short line had three mechanical signal boxes, including the Flemington Racecourse box opened in 1895.

Terminating facilities are provided at both the Showgrounds and Racecourse stations, and stabling facilities are provided at the Racecourse. The Showgrounds station has only one platform, on the up track, because trains terminate at Showgrounds when that station is in use. However, if necessary, down trains to Racecourse station can be routed via the Showgrounds platform then back to the down line.

Stations

Showgrounds
Showgrounds station is an intermediate station on the line, and is named for the adjacent Melbourne Showgrounds. The station is only open during special events, such as the annual Royal Melbourne Show. The station has turnstiles for entry to the Melbourne Showgrounds, and a Ticketek booking office for show admission tickets located on the platform.

A wooden station building is located at the station for selling rail tickets. The station is equipped with myki vending and top-up machines and validators.

Three abolished signal boxes are located at Showgrounds. Epsom Road box formerly controlled trains at the up end, Showgrounds Junction box for the down end, and Showgrounds Rostrum box (above the station platform) for all movements into and out of the platform.

Flemington Racecourse
Flemington Racecourse station is the terminus of the line, and is named for the adjacent racecourse. The station is only open on race days and during other special events, such as the annual Melbourne Cup during the Spring Racing Carnival. At other times it is used to stable trains between peak hours.

Possible extension
Some have suggested, including a former lord mayor of the City of Melbourne, that the line is under utilised in periods outside of events at the racecourse and showgrounds (most of the year) and should be extended to the west to service suburbs such as Maribyrnong (including a new housing estate being proposed by the State Government) and Keilor whilst also servicing the nearby Victoria University campus and the Highpoint Shopping Centre.

References

External links

Statistics and detailed schematic map at the VicSig enthusiast website

Railway lines in Melbourne
Railway lines opened in 1861
1861 establishments in Australia
Flemington, Victoria
Public transport routes in the City of Melbourne (LGA)